Millee Taggart (born September 2, 1940, Ottawa, Illinois) is an American actress, writer, and producer. She is best known for her role as Janet Bergman Collins on Search for Tomorrow. She portrayed the character from 1971 to 1982.  Her other acting roles on soaps include Gerry McGrath Pollock #3 on The Edge of Night and Millie Parks on One Life to Live.

She is also known for writing both comedic and dramatic series, which first started when the executives at Search for Tomorrow hired her as a writer in 1980, while she was still playing the role of Janet. From there, she wrote sitcoms such as The New Odd Couple and Joanie Loves Chachi. She was co-creator and Co-Executive Producer of The Thornes, which starred Tony Roberts, who had played her husband, Lee Pollock, in the 1960s on the soap opera The Edge of Night (in which played Gerry McGrath Pollock). 

She briefly wrote for Santa Barbara in 1984. She then joined As the World Turns from 1984 - 1985. She served as head writer of Ryan's Hope from 1985 - 1987. She later served on the All My Children writing team from 1996 - 1997. Her most famous writing achievements have been a three-year stint on Loving from 1988–1991 and a recent stint for Guiding Light from 2002 - 2003. 

Taggart was a co-executive producer of the reality TV series, Starting Over. She is also sometimes credited as Millee Taggart-Ratcliffe.

Taggart and novelist Barbara Taylor Bradford wrote a "bible" for a new daytime serial which was titled, Saints And Sinners.
Ms Taggart-Ratcliffe is currently Co-Executive Producer of Emmy Award winning series, Born This Way, on A&E.

Positions held
All My Children
Co-head writer: 1996–1997

As the World Turns
Head Writer: 1984–1985

The City
Writer: 1995–1996

Guiding Light
Co-Head Writer: 1994 - November 1994, 2002–2003

Loving
Script writer: 1994–1995
Head writer: 1988–1991, 1992–1993

Ryan's Hope
Head writer: 1985–1987

Santa Barbara
Writer: 1980s

Search for Tomorrow
Writer: 1980–1981

Starting Over
Executive Producer: 2004–2006

Awards and nominations
Daytime Emmy Awards

WINS
(1997; Best Writing; All My Children)
(2005; Outstanding Special Class Series; Starting Over)

NOMINATIONS 
(2003; Best Writing; Guiding Light)
(2006 & 2007; Outstanding Special Class Series; Starting Over)

Writers Guild of America Award

WINS
(1987 season; Ryan's Hope)
(1994 season; Loving)
(1997 season; All My Children)

NOMINATIONS 
(1993 season; Santa Barbara)
(1995 & 2003 seasons; Guiding Light) 
(1998 season; All My Children)

Head writing tenure

References

External links
 

1940 births
Actresses from Illinois 
American soap opera actresses
American soap opera writers
American women television writers
Living people
Daytime Emmy Award winners
Writers Guild of America Award winners
Women soap opera writers
21st-century American women